PFC Krylia Sovetov Samara is a football club from Russia based in Samara. It returned to the Russian Premier League for the 2021–22 season. In 2004, they finished third in the Russian Premier League.

History

Krylia Sovetov was founded in Kuybyshev (now Samara) in 1942. On 21 April 1946 the team played its first match in the highest division in the USSR in Alma-Ata, in which they lost 1–2 to Zenit Leningrad. Krylia Sovetov participated in 48 seasons of the Soviet Top League and 13 in the Russian Premier League, as well as 43 USSR Cups and 13 Russian Cups.

On 6 July 2002 Krylia Sovetov first played in a European competition, in the second round of the UEFA Intertoto Cup. They won this game with Dinaburg (Daugavpils, Latvia) played in Metallurg Stadium, by a score of 3–0. The goals were scored by Andrei Karyaka, Robertas Poškus and Rogério Gaúcho. In 2005, the team played in 2005–06 UEFA Cup and defeated BATE Borisov in the 2nd qualifying round (2–0, 2–0), but in the 1st round lost to AZ Alkmaar (5–3, 1–3). In 2009, they were eliminated in the Europa League 3rd qualifying round by St Patrick's Athletic.

2010 licensing controversy
Krylia Sovetov Samara, who were scheduled to pass licensing on 4 February 2010, asked Russian Football Union to postpone their licensing until 15 February of the same year due to financial problems and debts to players. The club was reported to be close to liquidation due to shortage of financing.

It later asked to postpone the licensing again to 19 February, but the RFU only postponed it until 17 February. On 17 February it was decided to postpone the licensing until 19 February after all. Krylia Sovetov finally received their license on 19 February after agreeing on new contracts with several companies to sponsor them, some of which might become partial owners of the club.

As the first matchday arrived, Krylia Sovetov were still banned from registering new players because of debts outstanding on old contracts. They could only register 11 players over 21 years old and several more players from the youth team that were registered for them in 2009. The transfer deadline had to be extended from 11 March to 8 April to accommodate Krylia Sovetov in hope they will pay their outstanding debts shortly. With injuries on top of that and only 16 players available for both their main squad and the reserve team, their reserve team had to finish their first game with 9 players on the field as they only had a goalkeeper on the bench after two players were injured, and the main squad had to play against Zenit St. Petersburg with a heavily diluted roster, so even the loss with the score 0–1 was saluted by the Krylia's fans. The transfer ban was confirmed again on 16 March, and was to remain in place until Krylia paid back their debts to their former players Jan Koller and Jiří Jarošík. Krylia lost the second game with the diluted roster 0–3 to Lokomotiv Moscow. The ban was finally lifted on 26 March.

League and cup history

USSR
{| class="wikitable mw-collapsible mw-collapsed" align=center cellspacing="0" cellpadding="3" style="border:1px solid #AAAAAA;font-size:90%"
|-bgcolor="#efefef"
! Season
! Div.
! Pos.
! Pl.
! W
! D
! L
! GS
! GA
! P
!Cup
!colspan=2|Europe
!Top scorer
!Head coach
|-
|align=center|1944
|align=center colspan=9|-
|align=center|R32
|align=center colspan=2|—
|align=left|
|align=left|
|-
|align=center|1945
|align=center|2nd
|align=center bgcolor=lightgreen|1
|align=center|17
|align=center|12
|align=center|3
|align=center|2
|align=center|37
|align=center|20
|align=center|27
|align=center|R32
|align=center colspan=2|—
|align=left| Rumyantsev – 13
|align=left| Novikov
|-
|align=center|1946
|align=center rowspan=10|1st
|align=center|10
|align=center|22
|align=center|3
|align=center|8
|align=center|11
|align=center|16
|align=center|52
|align=center|14
|align=center|R16
|align=center colspan=2|—
|align=left| Ratnikov – 5
|align=left| Novikov
|-
|align=center|1947
|align=center|7
|align=center|24
|align=center|8
|align=center|6
|align=center|10
|align=center|32
|align=center|45
|align=center|22
|align=center|R16
|align=center colspan=2|—
|align=left| Sinyakov – 9
|align=left| Abramov
|-
|align=center|1948
|align=center|11
|align=center|26
|align=center|5
|align=center|9
|align=center|12
|align=center|22
|align=center|40
|align=center|19
|align=center|R32
|align=center colspan=2|—
|align=left| Sinyakov – 5 Karpov – 5 Zaytsev – 5
|align=left| Abramov
|-
|align=center|1949
|align=center|10
|align=center|34
|align=center|10
|align=center|12
|align=center|12
|align=center|40
|align=center|61
|align=center|32
|align=center|R16
|align=center colspan=2|—
|align=left| Gulevsky – 9
|align=left| Abramov
|-
|align=center|1950
|align=center|7
|align=center|36
|align=center|15
|align=center|10
|align=center|11
|align=center|44
|align=center|44
|align=center|40
|align=center bgcolor=bronze|SF
|align=center colspan=2|—
|align=left| Gulevsky – 17
|align=left| Abramov
|-
|align=center|1951
|align=center|4
|align=center|28
|align=center|11
|align=center|12
|align=center|5
|align=center|34
|align=center|25
|align=center|34
|align=center|QF
|align=center colspan=2|—
|align=left| Voroshilov – 10
|align=left| Abramov
|-
|align=center|1952
|align=center|8
|align=center|13
|align=center|5
|align=center|3
|align=center|5
|align=center|16
|align=center|14
|align=center|13
|align=center|R64
|align=center colspan=2|—
|align=left| Voroshilov – 4
|align=left| Abramov
|-
|align=center|1953
|align=center|7
|align=center|20
|align=center|6
|align=center|5
|align=center|9
|align=center|22
|align=center|25
|align=center|17
|align=center bgcolor=silver|RU
|align=center colspan=2|—
|align=left| Gulevsky – 7
|align=left| Burmistrov
|-
|align=center|1954
|align=center|11
|align=center|24
|align=center|7
|align=center|6
|align=center|11
|align=center|20
|align=center|28
|align=center|20
|align=center|R32
|align=center colspan=2|—
|align=left| Voroshilov – 8
|align=left| Burmistrov Solovyov
|-
|align=center|1955
|align=center bgcolor=pink|11
|align=center|22
|align=center|4
|align=center|5
|align=center|13
|align=center|21
|align=center|39
|align=center|13
|align=center|R16
|align=center colspan=2|—
|align=left| Voroshilov – 7
|align=left| Solovyov
|-
|align=center|1956
|align=center|2nd, Group 2
|align=center bgcolor=lightgreen|1
|align=center|34
|align=center|26
|align=center|5
|align=center|3
|align=center|84
|align=center|19
|align=center|57
|align=center|-
|align=center colspan=2|—
|align=left| Kirsh – 17
|align=left| Solovyov
|-
|align=center|1957
|align=center rowspan=4|1st
|align=center|11
|align=center|22
|align=center|2
|align=center|8
|align=center|12
|align=center|9
|align=center|32
|align=center|12
|align=center|R16
|align=center colspan=2|—
|align=left| Redkin – 4
|align=left| Solovyov
|-
|align=center|1958
|align=center|10
|align=center|22
|align=center|6
|align=center|6
|align=center|10
|align=center|23
|align=center|29
|align=center|18
|align=center|R16
|align=center colspan=2|—
|align=left| Guzik – 5 Karpov – 5
|align=left| Abramov
|-
|align=center|1959
|align=center|11
|align=center|22
|align=center|6
|align=center|1
|align=center|15
|align=center|26
|align=center|37
|align=center|13
|align=center|-
|align=center colspan=2|—
|align=left| Brednev – 5 Khusainov – 5 Deynekin – 5
|align=left| Abramov
|-
|align=center|1960
|align=center bgcolor=pink|16
|align=center|30
|align=center|10
|align=center|8
|align=center|12
|align=center|37
|align=center|39
|align=center|28
|align=center|R32
|align=center colspan=2|—
|align=left| A. Kazakov – 9
|align=left| Abramov
|-
|align=center rowspan=2|1961
|align=center|2nd, RSFSR-3
|align=center|1
|align=center|23
|align=center|17
|align=center|2
|align=center|4
|align=center|68
|align=center|22
|align=center|26
|align=center rowspan=2|R16
|align=center colspan=2 rowspan=2|—
|align=left rowspan=2|
|align=left rowspan=2| Karpov
|-
|align=center|2nd, Final
|align=center bgcolor=lightgreen|1
|align=center|5
|align=center|4
|align=center|0
|align=center|1
|align=center|12
|align=center|5
|align=center|8
|-
|align=center|1962
|align=center rowspan=8|1st
|align=center|17
|align=center|30
|align=center|11
|align=center|5
|align=center|14
|align=center|39
|align=center|44
|align=center|27
|align=center|R16
|align=center colspan=2|—
|align=left| A. Kazakov – 16
|align=left| Karpov
|-
|align=center|1963
|align=center|15
|align=center|38
|align=center|11
|align=center|7
|align=center|20
|align=center|45
|align=center|53
|align=center|29
|align=center|R32
|align=center colspan=2|—
|align=left| B. Kazakov – 16
|align=left| Karpov
|-
|align=center|1964
|align=center|10
|align=center|32
|align=center|7
|align=center|14
|align=center|11
|align=center|24
|align=center|35
|align=center|28
|align=center bgcolor=silver|RU
|align=center colspan=2|—
|align=left| Kokh – 6
|align=left| Karpov
|-
|align=center|1965
|align=center|13
|align=center|32
|align=center|9
|align=center|9
|align=center|14
|align=center|34
|align=center|44
|align=center|27
|align=center bgcolor=bronze|SF
|align=center colspan=2|—
|align=left| A. Kazakov – 9 Zhukov – 9
|align=left| Karpov
|-
|align=center|1966
|align=center|18
|align=center|36
|align=center|4
|align=center|17
|align=center|15
|align=center|18
|align=center|40
|align=center|25
|align=center|R32
|align=center colspan=2|—
|align=left| Zhukov – 8
|align=left| Karpov
|-
|align=center|1967
|align=center|11
|align=center|36
|align=center|8
|align=center|18
|align=center|10
|align=center|23
|align=center|28
|align=center|34
|align=center|R32
|align=center colspan=2|—
|align=left| B. Kazakov – 7
|align=left| Karpov
|-
|align=center|1968
|align=center|18
|align=center|38
|align=center|9
|align=center|11
|align=center|18
|align=center|24
|align=center|45
|align=center|29
|align=center|R32
|align=center colspan=2|—
|align=left| B. Kazakov – 8
|align=left| Karpov
|-
|align=center|1969
|align=center bgcolor=pink|19
|align=center|34
|align=center|8
|align=center|8
|align=center|18
|align=center|34
|align=center|48
|align=center|24
|align=center|R32
|align=center colspan=2|—
|align=left| B. Kazakov – 13
|align=left| Karpov
|-
|align=center|1970
|align=center rowspan=6|2nd
|align=center|7
|align=center|42
|align=center|17
|align=center|13
|align=center|12
|align=center|43
|align=center|32
|align=center|47
|align=center|R64
|align=center colspan=2|—
|align=left| B. Kazakov – 14
|align=left| Blinkov
|-
|align=center|1971
|align=center|6
|align=center|42
|align=center|17
|align=center|9
|align=center|16
|align=center|54
|align=center|41
|align=center|43
|align=center|R32
|align=center colspan=2|—
|align=left| Aryapov – 14
|align=left| Blinkov
|-
|align=center|1972
|align=center|4
|align=center|38
|align=center|14
|align=center|17
|align=center|7
|align=center|50
|align=center|35
|align=center|45
|align=center|R32
|align=center colspan=2|—
|align=left| Krayev – 11
|align=left|
|-
|align=center|1973
|align=center|8
|align=center|38
|align=center|15
|align=center|7
|align=center|16
|align=center|46
|align=center|51
|align=center|34
|align=center|R32
|align=center colspan=2|—
|align=left| Krayev – 9
|align=left| Kirsh
|-
|align=center|1974
|align=center|4
|align=center|38
|align=center|20
|align=center|8
|align=center|10
|align=center|65
|align=center|41
|align=center|48
|align=center|R32
|align=center colspan=2|—
|align=left| Aryapov – 19
|align=left| Kirsh
|-
|align=center|1975
|align=center bgcolor=lightgreen|1
|align=center|38
|align=center|22
|align=center|9
|align=center|7
|align=center|78
|align=center|36
|align=center|53
|align=center|R32
|align=center colspan=2|—
|align=left| Aryapov – 25
|align=left| Kirsh
|-
|align=center|1976 spring
|align=center rowspan=3|1st
|align=center|6
|align=center|15
|align=center|6
|align=center|5
|align=center|4
|align=center|18
|align=center|15
|align=center|17
|align=center rowspan=2|R16
|align=center colspan=2 rowspan=2|—
|align=left| Aryapov – 6
|align=left rowspan=2| Kirsh
|-
|align=center|1976 autumn
|align=center|11
|align=center|15
|align=center|5
|align=center|4
|align=center|6
|align=center|12
|align=center|15
|align=center|14
|align=left| Aryapov – 3 Smirnov – 3 Filippov – 3
|-
|align=center|1977
|align=center bgcolor=pink|16
|align=center|30
|align=center|2
|align=center|7
|align=center|21
|align=center|18
|align=center|59
|align=center|11
|align=center|R32
|align=center colspan=2|—
|align=left|7 players – 2
|align=left| Kirsh
|-
|align=center|1978
|align=center|2nd
|align=center bgcolor=lightgreen|1
|align=center|38
|align=center|21
|align=center|14
|align=center|3
|align=center|59
|align=center|25
|align=center|56
|align=center|R32
|align=center colspan=2|—
|align=left| Yeliseyev – 18
|align=left| Gulevsky
|-
|align=center|1979
|align=center|1st
|align=center bgcolor=pink|18
|align=center|34
|align=center|7
|align=center|5
|align=center|22
|align=center|24
|align=center|60
|align=center|19
|align=center|QF
|align=center colspan=2|—
|align=left| R. Sidorov – 7
|align=left| Kirsh
|-
|align=center|1980
|align=center|2nd
|align=center bgcolor=pink|22
|align=center|46
|align=center|11
|align=center|16
|align=center|19
|align=center|43
|align=center|62
|align=center|34
|align=center|Qual.
|align=center colspan=2|—
|align=left| Lovchev – 13
|align=left| Fyodorov
|-
|align=center|1981
|align=center rowspan=3|3rd, Group 2
|align=center|7
|align=center|32
|align=center|11
|align=center|13
|align=center|8
|align=center|41
|align=center|26
|align=center|35
|align=center|-
|align=center colspan=2|—
|align=left|
|align=left| Streltsov
|-
|align=center|1982
|align=center|4
|align=center|32
|align=center|16
|align=center|7
|align=center|9
|align=center|40
|align=center|25
|align=center|39
|align=center|-
|align=center colspan=2|—
|align=left|
|align=left| Sarychev
|-
|align=center rowspan=2|1983
|align=center|1
|align=center|28
|align=center|19
|align=center|8
|align=center|1
|align=center|49
|align=center|18
|align=center|46
|align=center rowspan=2|-
|align=center colspan=2 rowspan=2|—
|align=left rowspan=2| Razveyev – 15 V. Sidorov – 15
|align=left rowspan=2| Sarychev
|-
|align=center|3rd, Final-3
|align=center|2
|align=center|4
|align=center|2
|align=center|1
|align=center|1
|align=center|3
|align=center|3
|align=center|5
|-
|align=center rowspan=2|1984
|align=center|3rd, Group 2
|align=center|1
|align=center|32
|align=center|21
|align=center|5
|align=center|6
|align=center|76
|align=center|24
|align=center|47
|align=center rowspan=2|R64
|align=center colspan=2 rowspan=2|—
|align=left rowspan=2| Razveyev – 23
|align=left rowspan=2| Sarychev
|-
|align=center|3rd, Final-1
|align=center bgcolor=lightgreen|1
|align=center|4
|align=center|3
|align=center|1
|align=center|0
|align=center|9
|align=center|3
|align=center|7
|-
|align=center|1985
|align=center|2nd
|align=center bgcolor=pink|20
|align=center|38
|align=center|10
|align=center|13
|align=center|15
|align=center|36
|align=center|42
|align=center|33
|align=center|-
|align=center colspan=2|—
|align=left| Razveyev – 8
|align=left| Sarychev
|-
|align=center rowspan=2|1986
|align=center|3rd, Group 2
|align=center|1
|align=center|33
|align=center|21
|align=center|5
|align=center|7
|align=center|55
|align=center|27
|align=center|47
|align=center rowspan=2|R64
|align=center colspan=2 rowspan=2|—
|align=left rowspan=2| Babanov – 16
|align=left rowspan=2| Lukashenko
|-
|align=center|3rd, Final-A
|align=center bgcolor=lightgreen|1
|align=center|4
|align=center|3
|align=center|1
|align=center|0
|align=center|4
|align=center|1
|align=center|7
|-
|align=center|1987
|align=center|2nd
|align=center bgcolor=pink|22
|align=center|42
|align=center|10
|align=center|12
|align=center|20
|align=center|40
|align=center|60
|align=center|32
|align=center|R64
|align=center colspan=2|—
|align=left| Popov – 9
|align=left| Lukashenko
|-
|align=center|1988
|align=center|3rd, Group 2
|align=center|3
|align=center|32
|align=center|15
|align=center|9
|align=center|8
|align=center|50
|align=center|28
|align=center|39
|align=center|R64
|align=center colspan=2|—
|align=left| Korolyov – 11
|align=left| Lukashenko
|-
|align=center rowspan=2|1989
|align=center|3rd, Group 1
|align=center|1
|align=center|42
|align=center|28
|align=center|8
|align=center|6
|align=center|79
|align=center|32
|align=center|64
|align=center rowspan=2|R32
|align=center colspan=2 rowspan=2|—
|align=left rowspan=2| Korolyov – 27
|align=left rowspan=2| Antikhovich
|-
|align=center|3rd, Final
|align=center|4
|align=center|5
|align=center|2
|align=center|0
|align=center|3
|align=center|6
|align=center|17
|align=center|4
|-
|align=center|1990
|align=center rowspan=2|3rd, "Centre"
|align=center|3
|align=center|42
|align=center|19
|align=center|11
|align=center|12
|align=center|53
|align=center|35
|align=center|49
|align=center|QF
|align=center colspan=2|—
|align=left| Korolyov – 16
|align=left| Antikhovich
|-
|align=center|1991
|align=center|2
|align=center|42
|align=center|26
|align=center|8
|align=center|8
|align=center|83
|align=center|41
|align=center|60
|align=center|R128
|align=center colspan=2|—
|align=left|  Fakhrutdinov – 19
|align=left|  Antikhovich
|-
|align=center|1992
|align=center colspan=9|-
|align=center|QF
|align=center colspan=2|—
|align=left|
|align=left|  Antikhovich
|}

Russia
{| class="wikitable mw-collapsible mw-collapsed" align=center cellspacing="0" cellpadding="3" style="border:1px solid #AAAAAA;font-size:90%"
|-bgcolor="#efefef"
! Season
! Div.
! Pos.
! Pl.
! W
! D
! L
! GS
! GA
! P
!Cup
!colspan=2|Europe
!Top scorer (league)
!Head coach
|-
|align=center|1992
|align=center rowspan=2|1st
|align=center|14
|align=center|30
|align=center|10
|align=center|11
|align=center|9
|align=center|27
|align=center|27
|align=center|31
|align=center|-
|align=center colspan=2|—
|align=left| Fakhrutdinov – 10
|align=left| Antikhovich
|-
|align=center rowspan=2|1993
|align=center|14
|align=center|34
|align=center|9
|align=center|12
|align=center|13
|align=center|37
|align=center|47
|align=center|30
|align=center rowspan=2|R64
|align=center colspan=2 rowspan=2|—
|align=left| Remezov – 11
|align=left rowspan=2| Antikhovich
|-
|align=center|Releg. Tourn.
|align=center|1
|align=center|5
|align=center|3
|align=center|1
|align=center|1
|align=center|10
|align=center|8
|align=center|7
|align=left| Valiyev – 5
|-
|align=center|1994
|align=center rowspan=20|1st
|align=center|13
|align=center|30
|align=center|6
|align=center|12
|align=center|12
|align=center|30
|align=center|51
|align=center|24
|align=center|R32
|align=center colspan=2|—
|align=left| Safronov – 7
|align=left| Bogdanov Kikin Averyanov
|-
|align=center|1995
|align=center|15
|align=center|30
|align=center|6
|align=center|8
|align=center|16
|align=center|34
|align=center|65
|align=center|26
|align=center|R32
|align=center colspan=2|—
|align=left| Avalyan – 10
|align=left| Averyanov
|-
|align=center|1996
|align=center|9
|align=center|34
|align=center|12
|align=center|9
|align=center|13
|align=center|31
|align=center|38
|align=center|45
|align=center|R32
|align=center colspan=2|—
|align=left| Makhlouf – 6
|align=left| Averyanov
|-
|align=center|1997
|align=center|7
|align=center|34
|align=center|14
|align=center|7
|align=center|13
|align=center|32
|align=center|30
|align=center|49
|align=center bgcolor="bronze"|SF
|align=center colspan=2|—
|align=left| S. Bulatov – 9
|align=left| Averyanov
|-
|align=center|1998
|align=center|12
|align=center|30
|align=center|9
|align=center|8
|align=center|13
|align=center|25
|align=center|37
|align=center|35
|align=center|QF
|align=center colspan=2|—
|align=left| Tsiklauri – 6
|align=left| Averyanov
|-
|align=center|1999
|align=center|12
|align=center|30
|align=center|8
|align=center|7
|align=center|15
|align=center|39
|align=center|49
|align=center|31
|align=center|R32
|align=center colspan=2|—
|align=left| Mikaelyan – 8
|align=left| Tarkhanov
|-
|align=center|2000
|align=center|14
|align=center|30
|align=center|8
|align=center|5
|align=center|17
|align=center|25
|align=center|45
|align=center|29
|align=center|R32
|align=center colspan=2|—
|align=left| Qosimov – 5
|align=left| Tarkhanov
|-
|align=center|2001
|align=center|5
|align=center|30
|align=center|14
|align=center|7
|align=center|9
|align=center|38
|align=center|23
|align=center|49
|align=center bgcolor="bronze"|SF
|align=center colspan=2|—
|align=left| Karyaka – 9
|align=left| Tarkhanov
|-
|align=center|2002
|align=center|5
|align=center|30
|align=center|15
|align=center|4
|align=center|11
|align=center|39
|align=center|32
|align=center|49
|align=center|QF
|align=center|IC
|align=center|QF
|align=left| Poškus – 11
|align=left| Tarkhanov
|-
|align=center|2003
|align=center|9
|align=center|30
|align=center|11
|align=center|9
|align=center|10
|align=center|38
|align=center|33
|align=center|42
|align=center|QF
|align=center colspan=2|—
|align=left| Karyaka – 9 Tikhonov – 9
|align=left| Tarkhanov  Gadzhiyev
|-
|align=center|2004
|align=center bgcolor="bronze"|3
|align=center|30
|align=center|17
|align=center|5
|align=center|8
|align=center|50
|align=center|41
|align=center|56
|align=center bgcolor="silver"|RU
|align=center colspan=2|—
|align=left| Karyaka – 17
|align=left| Gadzhiyev
|-
|align=center|2005
|align=center|14
|align=center|30
|align=center|7
|align=center|8
|align=center|15
|align=center|29
|align=center|44
|align=center|29
|align=center|QF
|align=center colspan=2|—
|align=left| Gusin – 7
|align=left| Gadzhiyev
|-
|align=center|2006
|align=center|10
|align=center|30
|align=center|10
|align=center|8
|align=center|12
|align=center|37
|align=center|35
|align=center|38
|align=center| R16
|align=center|UC
|align=center|1st Rnd.
|align=left| Topić – 7
|align=left| Gadzhiyev
|-
|align=center|2007
|align=center|13
|align=center|30
|align=center|8
|align=center|8
|align=center|14
|align=center|35
|align=center|46
|align=center|32
|align=center|QF
|align=center colspan=2|—
|align=left| Mujiri – 9
|align=left| Tarkhanov
|-
|align=center|2008
|align=center|6
|align=center|30
|align=center|12
|align=center|12
|align=center|6
|align=center|46
|align=center|28
|align=center|48
|align=center|R32
|align=center colspan=2|—
|align=left| Bobyor – 8
|align=left| Slutsky
|-
|align=center|2009
|align=center|10
|align=center|30
|align=center|10
|align=center|6
|align=center|14
|align=center|32
|align=center|42
|align=center|36
|align=center|R16
|align=center colspan=2|—
|align=left| Koller – 9
|align=left| Slutsky  Gazzaev
|-
|align=center|2010
|align=center|13
|align=center|30
|align=center|7
|align=center|10
|align=center|13
|align=center|28
|align=center|40
|align=center|31
|align=center|R32
|align=center|EL
|align=center|3rd QR
|align=left| Yakovlev – 4
|align=left| Gazzaev Tarkhanov
|-
|align=center|2011–12
|align=center|12
|align=center|44
|align=center|12
|align=center|15
|align=center|17
|align=center|33
|align=center|50
|align=center|51
|align=center|R32  R32
|align=center colspan=2|—
|align=left| Kornilenko – 10
|align=left| Tarkhanov Kobelev
|-
|align=center|2012–13
|align=center|14
|align=center|30
|align=center|7
|align=center|7
|align=center|16
|align=center|31
|align=center|52
|align=center|28
|align=center|R16
|align=center colspan=2|—
|align=left| Caballero – 8
|align=left| Kobelev Tsygankov Gadzhiyev
|-
|align=center|2013–14
|align=center bgcolor="pink"|14
|align=center|30
|align=center|6
|align=center|11
|align=center|13
|align=center|27
|align=center|46
|align=center|29
|align=center|R32
|align=center colspan=2|—
|align=left| Caballero – 6
|align=left| Tsygankov Kukhlevsky
|-
|align=center|2014–15
|align=center|2nd
|align=center bgcolor="lightgreen"|1
|align=center|34
|align=center|22
|align=center|7
|align=center|5
|align=center|54
|align=center|19
|align=center|73
|align=center|QF
|align=center colspan=2|—
|align=left| Jahović – 12
|align=left| Vercauteren
|-
|align=center|2015–16
|align=center rowspan=2|1st
|align=center|9
|align=center|30
|align=center|9
|align=center|8
|align=center|13
|align=center|19
|align=center|31
|align=center|35
|align=center|R16
|align=center colspan=2|—
|align=left| Gabulov Kornilenko – 12
|align=left| Vercauteren
|-
|align=center|2016–17
|align=center bgcolor="pink"|15
|align=center|30
|align=center|6
|align=center|10
|align=center|14
|align=center|31
|align=center|39
|align=center|28
|align=center|R16
|align=center colspan=2|—
|align=left| Kornilenko – 8
|align=left| Vercauteren   Visser (caretaker)  Skripchenko
|-
|align=center|2017–18
|align=center|2nd
|align=center bgcolor="lightgreen"|2
|align=center|38
|align=center|26
|align=center|4
|align=center|8
|align=center|60
|align=center|23
|align=center|82
|align=center|QF
|align=center colspan=2|—
|align=left| Kornilenko – 10
|align=left| Tikhonov
|-
|align=center|2018–19
|align=center rowspan=2|1st
|align=center|13
|align=center|30
|align=center|8
|align=center|4
|align=center|18
|align=center|25
|align=center|46
|align=center|28
|align=center|R16
|align=center colspan=2|—
|align=left| Kanunnikov – 5
|align=left| Tikhonov   Božović
|-
|2019–20
|align=center bgcolor="pink"|15
|align=center|30
|align=center|8
|align=center|7
|align=center|15
|align=center|33
|align=center|40
|align=center|31
|align=center|R16
|align=center colspan=2|—
|align=left| Sobolev – 10
|align=left| Božović   Talalayev
|-
|align=center|2020–21
|align=center|2nd
|align=center bgcolor="lightgreen"|1
|align=center|42
|align=center|32
|align=center|5
|align=center|5
|align=center|100
|align=center|26
|align=center|101
|align=center bgcolor="silver"|RU
|align=center colspan=2|—
|align=left| Ivan Sergeyev – 40
|align=left| Igor Osinkin
|-
|align=center|2021–22
|align=center|1st
|align=center|8
|align=center|30
|align=center|12
|align=center|5
|align=center|13
|align=center|39
|align=center|36
|align=center|41
|align=center|R32
|align=center colspan=2|—
|align=left| Vladislav Sarveli – 9
|align=left| Igor Osinkin
|}

European history

Current squad

Out on loan

Reserve squad

Coaching staff
 Head coach – Igor Osinkin
 Assistant coaches – Sergei Bulatov,  Sergei Kornilenko, Mikhail Semernya
 Goalkeeping coach – Viktor Gaus

Honours

Domestic competitions
Soviet Cup / Russian Cup:
Runners-up (4): 1953, 1964, 2004, 2020–21
Soviet First League / Russian National Football League: 7
 1945, 1956, 1961, 1975, 1978, 2014–15, 2020–21

Other honours
Progress Cup: 1
 1976 (spring)

Notable players

Had international caps for their respective countries. Players whose name is listed in bold represented their countries while playing for Krylia Sovetov.

Maksim Glushenkov
USSR/Russia
  Ravil Aryapov
  Aleksandr Babanov
  Galimzyan Khusainov
  Vladimir Kornilov
  Yuri Korotkikh
  Konstantin Krizhevsky
  Evgeny Lovchev
  Fyodor Novikov
  Mykola Pavlov
  Vladimir Sakharov
  Viktor Voroshilov
  Yuriy Yeliseyev
  Vasili Zhupikov
   Aleksandr Borodyuk
    Andrei Kanchelskis
    Vasili Kulkov
   Omari Tetradze
  Roman Adamov
  Aleksandr Anyukov
  Aleksei Arifullin
  Anton Bobyor
  Viktor Bulatov
  Taras Burlak
  Yevgeni Bushmanov
  Nikita Chernov
  Andrei Chichkin
  Vyacheslav Dayev
  Maksim Demenko
  Maksim Glushenkov
  Sergei Ignashevich
  Vladislav Ignatyev
  Oleg Ivanov
  Maksim Kanunnikov
  Andrei Karyaka
  Yevgeni Kharlachyov
  Denis Kolodin
  Dmitri Kombarov
  Aleksandr Kovalenko
  Ilya Maksimov
  Ramiz Mamedov
  Sergei Petrov
  Sergei Pinyayev
  Vladimir Pisarsky
  Igor Portnyagin
  Vladislav Radimov
  Sergey Ryzhikov
  Aleksandr Samedov
  Igor Semshov
  Roman Shishkin
  Aleksandr Sobolev
  Aleksandr Soldatenkov
  Andrei Solomatin
  Andrey Tikhonov
  Roman Vorobyov
  Dmitry Yefremov
  Roman Yevgenyev
  Roman Yezhov
Former USSR countries
Armenia
  Garnik Avalyan
  Karen Dokhoyan
  Karapet Mikaelyan
  Arthur Mkrtchyan
  Tigran Petrosyan
Azerbaijan
  Ramil Sheydayev

Belarus
  Vital Bulyha
  Alyaksandr Chayka
  Stanislaw Drahun
  Aliaksandr Hleb
  Andrey Hlebasolaw
  Timofei Kalachev
  Sergey Kornilenko
  Denis Kovba
  Dmitry Molosh
  Aliaksandr Oreshnikov
  Uladzimir Shuneyka
  Aleksey Skvernyuk
  Dmitry Verkhovtsov
  Syarhey Vyeramko
Georgia
  Aleksandre Amisulashvili
  Jano Ananidze
  Gia Grigalava
  Davit Gvaramadze
  Gela Inalishvili
  Giorgi Loria
  Davit Mujiri
  Zurab Popkhadze
  Giorgi Revazishvili
Lithuania
  Nerijus Barasa
  Andrius Jokšas
  Robertas Poškus
  Robertas Ringys
Moldova
  Vasile Coşelev
  Alexandru Epureanu
  Alexandru Gațcan
  Radu Gînsari
  Stanislav Ivanov
Tajikistan
  Farkhod Vosiyev
Ukraine
  Andriy Husin
  Oleksandr Kyryukhin
  Yuriy Sak
  Serhiy Shmatovalenko
Uzbekistan
  Bakhtiyor Ashurmatov
  Sergey Andreyev
  Marat Bikmoev
  Sergey Lushan
  Aleksey Polyakov
  Mirjalol Qosimov
  Andrei Rezantsev

Europe
Belgium
  Jeroen Simaeys
Bosnia and Herzegovina
  Marko Topić
  Danijel Majkić 
  Amar Rahmanović 
Bulgaria
  Dimitar Makriev
  Tenyo Minchev
Czech Republic
  Jiří Jarošík
  Jan Koller
Finland
  Berat Sadik

Macedonia
  Adis Jahović
Romania
  Paul Anton
  Cosmin Bărcăuan
  Florin Şoavă
Serbia and Montenegro
  Nenad Đorđević
  Vuk Rašović
   Ognjen Koroman
Slovakia
  Ján Mucha
Slovenia
  Suad Filekovič
  Nejc Pečnik
  Miral Samardžić
Spain
  Catanha

North and Central America
Haiti
 Reginal Goreux
Trinidad and Tobago
 Sheldon Bateau

South America
Brazil
  Roni
  Souza
Chile
  Nicolás Canales
  Eduardo Lobos
  Raúl Muñoz
Colombia
  Juan Carlos Escobar
  Carlos Quintero
Costa Rica
  Felicio Brown Forbes
Paraguay
  Luis Nery Caballero
  Pablo Zeballos

Africa
Algeria
  Raïs M'Bolhi
Cameroon
  Benoît Angbwa
  Serge Branco
Ghana
  Baba Adamu
  Laryea Kingston
  Mohammed Rabiu
Nigeria
  Patrick Ovie
  Duke Udi
South Africa
  Matthew Booth
Zambia
  Chaswe Nsofwa

Asia
Iraq
  Safaa Hadi 
North Korea
  Choe Myong-Ho
South Korea
  Oh Beom-Seok

Club records

Most league games for Krylia Sovetov

  Ravil Aryapov: 362
  Valeryan Panfilov: 359
  Aleksandr Kupriyanov: 328
 Gennadi Sakharov / Boris Valkov: 299
  Ravil Valiyev: 290
  Aleksandr Tsygankov: 279
  Viktor Karpov: 268
 Gennadi Platonov: 247
 Anatoli Blokhin: 242
  Yevgeny Mayorov: 233
  Boris Kazakov: 224
   Sergei Marushko / Ivan Shiryayev: 228
 Nikolai Martynov: 220
  Alfred Fyodorov: 219
  Denis Kovba: 215
 Anatoli Fetisov /   Dinar Sharipov: 211
   Viktor Gaus: 209

Most league goals for Krylia Sovetov

 Ravil Aryapov: 105
 Boris Kazakov: 76
 Anatoli Kazakov: 72
 Aleksandr Kupriyanov: 59
 Vladimir Korolyov: 57
 Aleksandr Gulevsky /  Ravil Valiyev: 51
 Andrei Karyaka: 49
 Viktor Razveev: 46
 Viktor Voroshilov: 44
  Vladimir Filippov /  Sergei Krayev: 41
 Aleksandr Babanov /  Valeryan Panfilov /  Ivan Sergeyev: 40
  Rustyam Fakhrutdinov /  Dmitri Sinyakov /  Anatoli Zhukov: 33
 Viktor Karpov /  Vadim Redkin: 32
 Garnik Avalyan /  Viktor Filippov: 28

Manager history

 Viktor Novikov (1945–46)
 Aleksandr Abramov (1947–52)
 Pyotr Burmistrov (1953–54)
 Vyacheslav Solovyov (1954–57)
 Aleksandr Abramov (1958–60)
 Viktor Karpov (1961–69)
 Nikolay Glebov (1969)
 Vsevolod Blinkov (1970–71)
 Gennady Sarychev (1972)
 Viktor Kirsh (1973–77)
 Aleksandr Gulevsky (1978)
 Viktor Kirsh (1979)
 Alfred Fyodorov (1980)
 Boris Streltsov (1981)
 Gennady Sarychev (1981–85)
 Viktor Lukashenko (1986–88)
  Viktor Antikhovich (1989–93)
 Valery Bogdanov (1994)
 Anatoly Kikin (1994)
 Aleksandr Averyanov (1994–98)
 Aleksandr Tarkhanov (1 Jan 1999 – 31 Dec 2003)
 Gadzhi Gadzhiyev (20 Nov 2003–06)
 Vladimir Kukhlevsky (2006)
 Gadzhi Gadzhiyev (2006–13 March 2007)
 Sergei Oborin (13 March 2007 – 31 Aug 2007)
 Aleksandr Tarkhanov (31 Aug 2007 – 11 Nov 2007)
 Leonid Slutsky (1 Jan 2008 – 26 Oct 2009)
 Yuri Gazzaev (26 Oct 2009 – 25 July 2010)
 Aleksandr Tarkhanov (27 July 2010 – 28 June 2011)
 Andrey Kobelev (30 June 2011 – 15 Nov 2012)
 A. Tsygankov (interim) (15 Nov 2012 – 29 Dec 2012)
 Gadzhi Gadzhiyev (27 Jan 2013 – 7 Aug 2013)
 A. Tsygankov (interim) (6 Aug 2013 – 28 Aug 2013)
 Aleksandr Tsygankov (29 Aug 2013 – 4 May 2014)
 V. Kukhlevsky (interim) (5 May 2014 – 7 June 2014)
 Franky Vercauteren (8 June 2014 – 31 October 2016)

References

External links

 
 

 
Association football clubs established in 1942
Football clubs in Russia
Sport in Samara, Russia
1942 establishments in Russia
Soviet Top League clubs